Hetaerius ferrugineus is a beetle belonging to the Histeridae family.

References

External links 

Histeridae
Beetles described in 1789